The 26th Metro Manila Film Festival was held in Manila, Philippines starting December 25.

Gloria Romero, received the Best Actress plum during the 2000 Metro Manila Film Festival for her role in Star Cinema's Tanging Yaman. It was a popular victory acknowledged with a standing ovation for a revered actress. The movie also received eight more major awards including the Best Picture, the Gatpuno Antonio J. Villegas Cultural Awards, Best Actor for Johnny Delgado and Metro Manila Film Festival Award for Best Director and Best Original Story for two-time winner Laurice Guillen among others. On the other hand, GMA Films' Deathrow took home four awards including the Second Best Picture.

Entries

Winners and nominees

Awards 

Winners are listed first and highlighted in boldface.

Multiple awards

References

External links 
 

Metro Manila Film Festival
MMFF
MMFF